The following is an episode list for the television series Voltron, an English language combination of the two unrelated Japanese series Beast King GoLion, and Armored Fleet Dairugger XV. The Voltron franchise, in total, has 200 episodes and one television special.

The original series began its run in 1984, airing 124 episodes, plus the one-hour "Fleet of Doom" special. In 1998, a new CGI-series entitled Voltron: The Third Dimension premiered, consisting of two seasons and 26 episodes. In 2011, Voltron Force premiered on Nicktoons, with one season and 26 episodes. And on June 10, 2016, Voltron: Legendary Defender premiered on Netflix.

Lion Force Voltron

Part 1 (1984)
Based on Golion.

Part 2 (1985)
Original American-created episodes, starring Lion Force Voltron.

Vehicle Team Voltron (1984–1985)
Based on Dairugger XV.

References

External links

Voltron
Voltron
Voltron
Voltron